Vilanova is one of four parishes (administrative divisions) in Villanueva de Oscos, a municipality within the province and autonomous community of Asturias, in northern Spain. 

Villages

Referencies 

Parishes in Villanueva de Oscos